QVS may refer to:

 Queen Victoria School (Fiji)
 Queen Victoria School, Dunblane, Scotland
 Lamas Quechua, a language of Peru (ISO code: qvs)